Colonel John Henry Moore (August 13, 1800–December 2, 1880) was an early Texas settler, one of the Old Three Hundred first land grantees to settle in Mexican Texas.

Early life
Moore was born August 13, 1800, in Rome, Smith County, Tennessee.  It is said that John Henry Moore ran away from college to avoid studying Latin. He went to Spanish Texas in 1818. (His father took him back to Tennessee, and he returned to Texas in 1821.)

Military career
He built Moore's Fort at present-day La Grange, Texas, in 1828; but he is best known for commanding the Battle of Gonzales on October 2, 1835. In 1839 he led a force of 60 Texans, from Austin, along with their Lipan Apache allies, under chief Castro, to the San Saba river and attacked an emcampment of Commanche, killing and wounding many and recovering a considerable number of horses and equipment from them. He was elected a colonel of the Texan army and served as a member of the council of war. Commander Stephen F. Austin ordered Moore to organize a cavalry company, who brought their own pistols and double-barreled shotguns.

During the Civil War, Moore enlisted in Terry's Texas Rangers. Being 61 years old, he was appointed to a committee to help secure bonds for financing the Confederate cause.

Community life
John H. Moore established the first church in Fayette County, Texas, in the fort building.

Death
Moore died December 2, 1880.

References

External links
 John Henry Moore in Handbook of Texas Online 

1800 births
1880 deaths
People of Mexican Texas
Old Three Hundred
People of the Texas Revolution
Army of the Republic of Texas officers